Miss USA 1982 was the 31st Miss USA pageant, televised live on May 13, 1982 from the Gulf Coast Convention Center in Biloxi, Mississippi on CBS.

The pageant was won by Terri Utley of Arkansas, who was crowned by outgoing titleholder Kim Seelbrede of Ohio.  Utley was the first – and to date only – woman from Arkansas to win the Miss USA title, and went on to place as 4th runner-up at Miss Universe 1982. 

Jeannine Boger of North Carolina is the mother of Miss USA 2009 Kristen Dalton.

Results

Placements

Special awards

Historical significance 
 Arkansas wins competition for the first time and surpasses its previous highest placement in 1955. Also becoming in the 21st state who does it for the first time.
 Texas earns the 1st runner-up position for the fourth time. The last time it placed this was in 1971.
 Utah earns the 2nd runner-up position for the first time and reached its highest placement since Linda Bement won in 1960. Ironically, Bement went on to win Miss Universe title in 1960.
 Ohio earns the 3rd runner-up position for the first time and reached its highest placement since Kim Seelbrede won in the previous year.
 Kentucky earns the 4th runner-up position for the fourth time. The last time it placed this was in 1980.
 States that placed in semifinals the previous year were Hawaii, Maryland, Ohio, Tennessee, Texas and Virginia.
 Texas placed for the eighth consecutive year.
 Maryland placed for the third consecutive year. 
 Hawaii, Ohio, Tennessee and Virginia made their second consecutive placement.
 Kentucky last placed in 1980.
 Massachusetts last placed in 1979.
 Utah last placed in 1978.
 Michigan last placed in 1976.
 Vermont last placed in 1971.
 Arkansas last placed in 1970.
 Alabama breaks an ongoing streak of placements since 1980.
 Arizona breaks an ongoing streak of placements since 1979.

Delegates
The Miss USA 1982 delegates were:

 Alabama - Lisa Wheeler
 Alaska - Toni McFadden
 Arizona - Lori Hakola
 Arkansas - Terri Utley
 California - Suzanne Dewames
 Colorado - Dusty Hutton
 Connecticut - Maureen Szekeres
 Delaware - Shawna Saints
 District of Columbia - Lori Esteep
 Florida - Lisa Smith
 Georgia - Kelly Blackston
 Hawaii - Vanessa Dubois
 Idaho - Valerie Stephan
 Illinois - Carla Danielson
 Indiana - Sara Binckley
 Iowa - Jeanne Hoyer
 Kansas - Stefanie Larson
 Kentucky - Kristina Chapman
 Louisiana - Lisa Michael
 Maine - Theresa Cloutier
 Maryland - Angie Boyer
 Massachusetts - Janet Marie Flaherty
 Michigan - Diane Arabia
 Minnesota - Lori Kmetz
 Mississippi - Nancy Perkins
 Missouri - Susan Heiman
 Montana - Perri Stevenson
 Nebraska - Lori Novicki
 Nevada - Andrea Pennington
 New Hampshire - Kathy Rogers
 New Jersey - Janice Lynn Straub
 New Mexico - Lisa Allen
 New York - Annemarie Henderson
 North Carolina - Jeannine Dalton
 North Dakota - Tammi Martinson
 Ohio - Kim Weeda
 Oklahoma - Jill Liebmann
 Oregon - Kristina Bauer
 Pennsylvania - Therese Rosa
 Rhode Island - Peggy McGraw
 South Carolina - Margo Wood
 South Dakota - Meaghan North
 Tennessee - Sherly Deanice "Nise" Levy
 Texas - Luann Caughey
 Utah - Susan Gasser
 Vermont - Georgia Davis
 Virginia - Sondra Dee Jones
 Washington - Jana Minerich
 West Virginia - Cindy Baniak
 Wisconsin - Cheryl Maslowski
 Wyoming - Judy Wilder

Judges
Summer Bartholomew, Miss USA 1975 from California
Vic Damone, singer
Jineane Ford, Miss USA 1980 from Arizona
Georgia Gibbs, singer
John James, actor
Julia Meade, actress
Robert Pine, actor
Freddie Solomon, NFL player
Michelle Stevens, Model
Gordon Cooper

External links 
 

1982
May 1982 events in the United States
1982 beauty pageants
1982 in Mississippi
1982